Ivan Paštrić (1636 – 20 March 1708) was a scientist, poet, linguist and editor of the Glagolitic liturgical books.

Paštrić was born in Poljica in Dalmatia and taken to Split in the first year of his life. In Split baptismal records is recorded that Ivan Paštrić, son of Antonia and Ivanica, was baptized by Andrea Reggio on 15 June 1636.

Paštrić was lecturer at the college of the Sacred Congregation for the Propagation of the Faith in Rome. In about 1700 donated his rich library to the seminary in Split. The books he donated became a basis of the Split Seminary Library. Jerolim Kavanjin referred to Paštrić as "master of all science".

Paštrić was probably a member of the Illyrian Academy founded in 1703 by John Peter Marchi. The establishment of the academy was probably initiated by Paštrić. During last two years of his life Paštrić was president of the Illyrian Society of St. Jerome.

Paštrić was buried in the yard of the guesthouse of the Illyrian College of Loreto.

See also

 List of Glagolitic books

References

Sources 

 
 
 
 
 
 
 
 

1636 births
1708 deaths
Illyrian Academy
Members of the Congregation for the Evangelization of Peoples